Chambre des représentants may refer to:

Belgian Chamber of Representatives (Chambre des représentants de Belgique), the Chamber of Representatives of Belgium
Chambre des représentants du Maroc, the Chamber of Representatives of Morocco
Chambre des représentants de France, the 1815 French Chamber of Representatives during the Hundred Days